Klemm is a German surname. Notable people with the surname include:

 Johann Conrad Klemm (1655–1717), German Lutheran theologian
 Walther Klemm (1883–1957), German painter, printmaker, and illustrator
 Hanns Klemm (1885–1961), German aircraft pioneer and founder of the Klemm Leichtflugzeugbau GmbH (Klemm Light Aircraft Company)
 Richard Klemm (1902–1988), German cellist, composer and teacher
 Werner Klemm (1909–1990), Romanian-German ornithologist
 Rudolf Klemm (fl. 1944), German pilot during WWII
 Richard O. Klemm (1932–2010), American businessman and politician
 Matthias Klemm (born 1941), German graphic designer
 Hans G. Klemm (born 1957), United States diplomat
 Ekkehard Klemm (born 1958), German conductor
 Jon Klemm (born 1970), Canadian ice hockey player
 Adrian Klemm (born 1977), American Football player
 Brian Klemm (born 1982), American musician with third wave ska band Suburban Legends

See also
 Klem (disambiguation)
 Klemme (disambiguation)

German-language surnames